Argenteuil—Papineau—Mirabel (formerly known as Argenteuil, Argenteuil—Papineau and Argenteuil—Deux-Montagnes) was a federal electoral district in Quebec, Canada, that was represented in the House of Commons of Canada from 1867 to 2015.

Geography

Initially, Argenteuil consisted of the Parishes of Saint Andrews, Saint Jérusalem, part of the Parish of St. Jérome, the Townships of Chatham, Wentworth, Grenville and Augmentation, Harrington and Augmentation, Gore, Howard, Arundel, Montcalm Wolfe, Salaberry and Grandisson, and part of the Township of Morin.

In 1882, the townships of Salaberry, Wolfe and Grandison were detached from Argenteuil and annexed to Terrebonne.

In 1924, Argenteuil electoral district was redefined to consist of the County of Argenteuil.

In 1933, Argenteuil electoral district was expanded to include the portion of the County of Two-Mountains lying north of the North River, consisting of the municipality of St-Colomban and the northern part of the municipality of St-Canut.

The electoral district was abolished in 1947 and became part of Argenteuil—Deux-Montagnes.

In 1966, Argenteuil electoral district was re-created, consisting of the City of Deux-Montagnes, the Towns of Barkmere, Lachute, Oka-sur-le-Lac and Saint-Eustache, the Counties of Argenteuil and Deux-Montagnes, and the village municipality of Saint-Sauveur-des-Monts and the parish municipality of Saint-Sauveur in the County of Terrebonne.

The electoral district's name was changed in 1970 to Argenteuil—Deux-Montagnes.

In 1976, the name reverted to Argenteuil when it was slightly redistricted: Deux-Montagnes, Pointe-Calumet and Saint-Joseph-du-Lac became part of a new district, with the rest of Deux-Montagnes county remaining in Argenteuil, while Saint-Sauveur and Saint-Sauveur-des-Monts where transferred to join most of Terrebonne county in Labelle (electoral district). Its name changed in 1980 to Argenteuil—Papineau.

In 1987, it was redefined to consist of the towns of Barkmere, Lachute and Mirabel, the County of Argenteuil, and parts of the Counties of Deux-Montagnes and Papineau.

In 1996, it was redefined to consist of the cities of Barkmere, Lachute, Mirabel and Thurso, the county regional municipalities of Argenteuil, Papineau, and Deux-Montagnes, including Kanesatake Indian Reserve No. 16, excepting the cities of Deux-Montagnes, Saint-Eustache and Sainte-Marthe-sur-le-Lac, the Parish Municipality of Saint-Colomban, the township municipalities of Amherst and Arundel, and the municipalities of Huberdeau, Montcalm, Lac-des-Seize-Îles, Morin-Heights, Saint-Adolphe-d'Howard and Wentworth-Nord.

Argenteuil—Papineau—Mirabel now consists of the City of Mirabel, the regional county municipalities of Argenteuil and Papineau, the municipalities of Oka, Pointe-Calumet, Saint-Joseph-du-Lac and Saint-Placide, including Kanesatake Indian Lands No. 16, and the municipalities of Lac-des-Seize-Îles, Morin-Heights, Saint-Adolphe-d'Howard and Wentworth-Nord.

The neighbouring ridings are Pontiac, Laurentides—Labelle, Rivière-du-Nord, Terrebonne—Blainville, Marc-Aurèle-Fortin, Rivière-des-Mille-Îles, Pierrefonds—Dollard, Lac-Saint-Louis, Vaudreuil-Soulanges, and Glengarry—Prescott—Russell.

Members of Parliament

This riding has elected the following Members of Parliament:

Election results

Argenteuil—Papineau—Mirabel 2004-present

|align="left" colspan=2|New Democratic Party gain from Bloc Québécois
|align="right"|Swing
|align="right"| +25.5
|align="right"|

Source: Elections Canada

Argenteuil—Mirabel 2004

Argenteuil—Papineau—Mirabel 2000

Argenteuil—Papineau 1984-1997

Argenteuil 1976-1980

Argenteuil—Deux-Montagnes (1970-1976)

|-
  
|Liberal
|Francis Fox   
|align="right"|20,414 || 54.51 
  
|Progressive Conservative
|Roger Régimbal 
|align="right"| 10,418 || 27.82

 
|New Democratic Party
|Ronald-L. Dufault
|align="right"|2,286   || 6.10

|-
  
|Liberal
|Francis Fox  
|align="right"|18,749   || 49.47

  
|Progressive Conservative
|Michel Chevalier
|align="right"| 7,987 || 21.07
 
|New Democratic Party
|Ronald-L. Dufault
|align="right"|1,929   || 5.09 

|No affiliation 
|Michel-E. Trudeau
|align="right"|1,036   || 2.73

Argenteuil (1966-1970)

Argenteuil—Deux-Montagnes (1947-1966)

  
|Liberal
|Vincent Drouin 
|align="right"| 11,761 
|align="right"| 42.34
  
|Progressive Conservative
|Joseph-Octave Latour
|align="right"|10,589 
|align="right"| 38.12

 
|Independent 
|Kenneth P. Riley
|align="right"|695
|align="right"|2.50
 
|Unknown
|Gilbert Edgar Arnold
|align="right"|636 
|align="right"|2.29

  
|Progressive Conservative
|Joseph-Octave Latour 
|align="right"|14,483 
|align="right"| 56.57
  
|Liberal
|Bernard-L. Gosselin
|align="right"| 10,493
|align="right"| 40.99 
 
|Independent PC
|Georges Duhamel
|align="right"|626 
|align="right"| 2.45

|-
  
|Liberal
|Philippe Valois
|align="right"| 10,084 
|align="right"| 41.89
  
|Progressive Conservative
|Joseph-Octave Latour 
|align="right"|8,902 
|align="right"| 36.98
 
|Independent Liberal
|Antoine Pare
|align="right"|3,983 
|align="right"| 16.55
 
|Independent Liberal
|Ethel M. McGibbon
|align="right"|1,102  
|align="right"| 4.58

|-
  
|Liberal
|Philippe Valois
|align="right"| 13,283 || 70.31
  
|Progressive Conservative
|Linton William Armstrong
|align="right"|5,608 || 29.69

|-
  
|Liberal
|Philippe Valois 
|align="right"| 10,500 || 50.84
  
|Progressive Conservative
|Georges-Henri Héon
|align="right"|9,672 || 46.83
  
|Union of Electors
|Joseph-Orphir Desjardins
|align="right"|481    || 2.33

Argenteuil (1867-1947)

By-election: On Mr. Perley's death:
 
 
|Independent Conservative
|Georges-Henri Héon
|align="right"|4,939 || 57.26
  
|Liberal
|Joseph-Louis-Lorenzo Legault
|align="right"| 3,281 || 38.04
 
|Independent
|Joseph Maurice Navion
|align="right"|405 || 4.70

By-election: On Mr. McGibbon's death:
 
  
|Liberal
|Charles Stewart 
|align="right"|acclaimed   

By-election: On Mr. Christie's death:

  
|Liberal
|Thomas Christie, Jr. 
|align="right"| 1,261    || 54.10
  
|Conservative
|George Halsey Perley  
|align="right"|1,070    45.90

By-election: On election being declared void:

|-
  
|Liberal-Conservative
|John Abbott
|align="right"|acclaimed   

By-election: On election being declared void:

|-
  
|Liberal-Conservative
|John Abbott
|align="right"|936  ||51.68
  
|Liberal
|Thomas Christie  
|align="right"|869    || 48.14

By-election: On election being declared void, on petition:

|-
  
|Liberal
|Thomas Christie  
|align="right"|acclaimed   

By-election: On Mr. Abbott being unseated, on petition:

|-
  
|Liberal
|Lemuel Cushing, Jr. 
|align="right"|840 || 53.30
 
|Unknown
|William Owens
|align="right"|736   ||46.70

See also
 List of Canadian federal electoral districts
 Past Canadian electoral districts

References

Campaign expense data from Elections Canada
Riding history from the library of Parliament:
Argenteuil, Quebec (1867 - 1947)
Argenteuil--Deux-Montagnes, Quebec (1947 - 1966)
Argenteuil, Quebec (1966 - 1970)
Argenteuil--Deux-Montagnes, Quebec (1970 - 1976)
(1976 - 1980)
(1980 - 1999)
(1999 - 2003)
(2003 - 2004)
(2004 - present)

Notes

Former federal electoral districts of Quebec
Boisbriand
Lachute
Mirabel, Quebec